Vincenzo Rossello (16 February 1923 – 20 January 1989) was an Italian professional road bicycle racer from 1946 to 1957. He won two stages in the Tour de France.

Major results

1948
Tour de France:
Winner stage 2
1949
Tour de France:
Winner stage 18
1951
Giro d'Italia:
9th place overall classification
1953
Giro d'Italia:
10th place overall classification

External links 

Official Tour de France results for Vincenzo Rossello

Italian male cyclists
1923 births
1989 deaths
Italian Tour de France stage winners
Sportspeople from the Province of Savona
Cyclists from Liguria